South Florida Gay News is a South Florida-based alternative weekly newspaper published by Norm Kent. It was first launched in 2009.

References

External links

Alternative weekly newspapers published in the United States
Monthly magazines published in the United States
News magazines published in the United States
Companies based in Broward County, Florida
LGBT culture in Miami
LGBT-related newspapers published in the United States
LGBT-related websites
Magazines established in 2009
Magazines published in Florida
LGBT in Florida
2009 establishments in Florida